Fresh Aire II is the second album that new-age musical group Mannheim Steamroller originally released in 1977. Each of the first four Fresh Aire albums is based on a season; Fresh Aire IIs theme is fall.

Fresh Aire II is unique in the series in that it is largely based on a single melody, presented consistently in the "Fantasia" music cycle (tracks 1–9) which starts off with 'Chorale,' followed by the seven "doors," ending with the piece 'Fantasy' and in the closing track 'Going To Another Place.' The same melody also occasionally appears in other albums in the series in a form closest to the first few notes in "The First Door."

Track listing
All songs written and arranged by Chip Davis
"Chorale" – 0:36
"The First Door – Interrupted Thought" – 1:26
"The Second Door – The Ugly Head of Greed" – 2:02
"The Third Door – Pride" – 2:30
"The Fourth Door – Relaxation" – 3:50
"The Fifth Door – Frenetic Energy" – 2:59
"The Sixth Door – Nostalgia" – 1:28
"Door Seven – Thermal Inversion" – 1:57
"Fantasy" – 1:24
"Interlude V" – 3:37
"Velvet Tear" – 2:44
"A Shade Tree" – 4:57
"Toota Lute" – 2:50
"Going to Another Place" – 3:20

Personnel
Jackson Berkey – piano, harpsichord, synthesizer, Fender Rhodes, concert bells, vocal chant
Eric Hansen – bass, lute, classical guitar
Chip Davis – drums, recorders, dulcimer, percussion, vocal chant
Walt Meskell – rhythm guitar
Dave Kappy – French horn
Gene Badgett – trumpet
Bob Jenkins – oboe
Melody Malec – harp
Milt Bailey – vocal chant
Hugh Brown, Dorothy Brown, Ginni Eldred, Merton Shatzkin, Joe Landes, Mortimer Alpert – violins
Alex Sokol, Lucinda Gladics, James Hammond – viola
Miriam Duffelmeyer, Beth McCollum, Jean Hassel – cello

References

1977 albums
2
American Gramaphone albums